Streptomyces rhizosphaericola is a bacterium species from the genus of Streptomyces which has been isolated from wheat rhizosphere.

See also 
 List of Streptomyces species

References 

rhizosphaericola
Bacteria described in 2019